Frank Merle (born 22 November 1962, in Marseille) is a French mathematician, specializing in partial differential equations and mathematical physics.

Education and career
After graduation from the École normale supérieure (ENS), Merle received in 1987 his Ph.D. from the University of Paris VI under Henri Berestycki with thesis Contributions a l'etude de certaines equations aux derivees partielles non lineaires de la physique mathematique. He became a researcher for CNRS at ENS. In 1989/90 he was an assistant professor at the Courant Institute of Mathematical Sciences of the University of New York. Since 1991 Merle has been a professor at the University of Cergy-Pontoise. From 1998 to 2003 he was a member of the Institut Universitaire de France.
In the fall of 1996, the fall of 2001, and the academic year 2003–2004 he was a visiting scholar at the Institute for Advanced Study. He was a visiting professor at Stanford University, Rutgers University, the University of Chicago, the Mathematical Sciences Research Institute (MSRI) at Berkeley, Leiden University, and the University of Tokyo.

Mathematical research
Merle does research on partial differential equations (PDEs) and mathematical physics, notably dispersive nonlinear PDEs such as the nonlinear Schrödinger equation and the Korteweg-de Vries equation, and the study of such PDE solutions which over time break down or diverge (blow up). Such research earned him in 2005 the Bôcher Prize.

Selected publications
 with Yvan Martel: 
 with Y. Martel: 
 with Pierre Raphäel:

Awards and honors
 1997 : Prix de l'Institut Poincaré en Physique théorique
 1998 : Invited speaker at the International Congress of Mathematicians in Berlin; lecture entitled Blow-up phenomena for critical nonlinear Schrödinger and Zakharov equations
 2000 : Prix Charles-Louis de Saulse de Freycinet de l'Académie des Sciences de Paris
 2005 : Médaille d'argent du CNRS
 2005 : Bôcher Prize
 2014 : Plenary speaker at the International Congress of Mathematicians in Seoul; lecture entitled Asymptotics for critical nonlinear dispersive equations
 2018 : Prix Ampère awarded by French Academy of Sciences
 2023 : Bôcher Memorial Prize

References

1962 births
Living people
PDE theorists
20th-century French mathematicians
21st-century French mathematicians
École Normale Supérieure alumni
University of Paris alumni
Institute for Advanced Study visiting scholars
Scientists from Marseille
Courant Institute of Mathematical Sciences faculty